Pelargonium australe is a perennial herb that is endemic to Australia, and found in all states except the Northern Territory. Common names include  native storksbill, wild geranium and austral storksbill.  The species grows to 50 cm high and has leaves with 5 to 7 lobes. Umbels of 4 to 12 flowers appear between October and March in the species' native range. These are pink with darker markings.

The species was first formally described in 1800 by German botanist Carl Ludwig Willdenow.

It occurs on sand dunes, coastal cliffs and rocky outcrops.

In cultivation, the species prefers a sunny or lightly shaded position and is adaptable to a wide range of soil types. It is readily propagated by cuttings.

References

External links 
Pelargonium australe  Occurrence data from the Australasian Virtual Herbarium.

australe
Flora of the Australian Capital Territory
Flora of Lord Howe Island
Flora of New South Wales
Flora of Queensland
Flora of South Australia
Flora of Tasmania
Flora of Victoria (Australia)
Flora of Western Australia
Plants described in 1800
Taxa named by Carl Ludwig Willdenow